The LG Cup is an exhibition association football tournament that took place in Morocco.

Participants
The participants were:

 Algeria B
 Morocco Olympic

Results

Semifinals

Third place match

Final

Scorers
 1 goal
  Mojahed Khaziravi
  Olympic Mohamed Madihi
  Olympic Bouabid Bouden

See also
LG Cup

References

International association football competitions hosted by Morocco
2002–03 in Moroccan football